Carlton Cole "Carl" Magee (January 5, 1872 – February 1946) was an American lawyer and newspaper publisher. He also patented the first practical parking meter.  He was born in Iowa. Magee graduated from Upper Iowa University in 1896.

Magee founded the Magee's Independent in 1922, which would change its name to the New Mexico State Tribune in 1923 and to the Albuquerque Tribune in 1933. The Tribune closed in 2008.  Magee was important in bringing the Teapot Dome scandal to the fore. When a judge Magee had once accused of corruption knocked him down in a hotel lobby, Magee drew his pistol and fired, accidentally killing a bystander. Magee was acquitted of manslaughter, but moved to Oklahoma City to run the Oklahoma News. He was the paper's editor until he was transferred to the Oklahoma City News.

Carl Magee was an attorney and newspaper editor who joined the Oklahoma City Chamber of Commerce traffic committee in 1933 and, shortly thereafter, was charged with lessening the escalating traffic congestion in the city's downtown. Local merchants complained that their sales were hurt by low traffic turnover, since parking spaces adjacent to downtown businesses were occupied by the same cars all day. Magee conceived the idea of a coin-operated timer that could be used to increase traffic turnover in busy commercial thoroughfares, and he sponsored a contest at the University of Oklahoma to develop such a device. After the contest, Magee designed and patented his own model and sought Professors H. G. Thuesen and Gerald Hale from Oklahoma Agricultural and Mechanical College (now Oklahoma State University) to help him develop his model into an operating meter. The first model eventually created was powered by a clock-type mainspring, which required subsequent winding by parking patrons after they had fed coins into the meter. Magee later partnered with Gerald Hale to form the Magee-Hale Park-O-Meter Company, predecessor to the modern POM, Inc.

The first parking meters were installed in downtown Oklahoma City on July 16, 1935, and charged five cents per hour. Businesses benefited greatly from the decreased parking congestion, but some outraged citizens complained and even initiated legal action in response to installation of the meters. Legal action failed to halt implementation of the meters, however, and the added benefits of revenue generation quickly led other cities to install parking meters of their own.

The earliest Magee-Hale meters were manufactured in Oklahoma City and Tulsa, Oklahoma, by Rockwell International, which moved its meter production to Russellville, Arkansas in 1963. POM, Inc., as constituted today was organized in 1976 to purchase the parking meter production operations from Rockwell, as well as its Russellville plant.

New ownership and production facility expansion occurred at POM in the 1980s, and POM unveiled its patented “Advanced Parking Meter” (APM) in 1992, featuring a choice of battery or solar power, among other improvements. According to its website, the company today “has the largest plant in the world devoted to the manufacturing of digital parking meters.”

Magee switched from Republican to Democrat and ran unsuccessfully for the United States Senate.

He is best known in journalism today for the E.W. Scripps Company motto, adopted from Dante for the Albuquerque Tribune and which is now carried by all Scripps chain newspapers: “Give Light and the People Will Find Their Own Way.”

Magee died in Tulsa, Oklahoma in February 1946.

Sources

https://web.archive.org/web/20080516050845/http://www.ionet.net/~luttrell/history.html
http://www.rootsweb.ancestry.com/~okoklaho/obit/magee_carl_c.htm
http://www.inc.com/magazine/20021001/24702.html

1944 deaths
American publishers (people)
1872 births
Upper Iowa University alumni